Ana Ligia Fabian Hernández (born November 7, 1988) is a  volleyball player from the Dominican Republic, who participated in the 2007 Junior World Championship in Thailand. She competed as wing spiker, wearing the #4 jersey. At the 2006 U-20 NORCECA Women´s Junior Continental Championship, she took with her team the silver medal.

She participated with Ingrid Carmona at the NORCECA Beach Volleyball Circuit in 2007 and 2009 with Ysaires Restituyo, finishing in 11th and 9th position.

Clubs
  Mirador (2003)
  Los Prados (2004–2005)
  Mirador (2006)
  Aviación (2006)
  Distrito Nacional (2007)
  San Juan (2008)

References

External links
 Ana Ligia Fabian Hernandez at the FIVB World Grand Prix 2006
 
 

1988 births
Living people
Dominican Republic beach volleyball players
Women's beach volleyball players
Dominican Republic women's volleyball players
Wing spikers